Jamie Bates (born 14 September 1989) is an English welterweight kickboxer fighting out of Annfield Plain, County Durham, England. He is the Superkombat World Grand Prix II 2014 tournament winner.

Kickboxing career

Early career
Jamie Bates grew up on the mats in his father's gym in region of Durham. Starting with karate at age 4, with his father as instructor, Bates eventually progressed to kickboxing. He won a professional world title when he was 22.

Superkombat Fighting Championship
Selected from the Superkombat World Tryouts from Middlesbrough, England, Bates had signed a multi-fight deal with the SUPERKOMBAT in 2014. On 24 May 2014, he was a participant in the Superkombat World Grand Prix series. Bates faced Flavius Boiciuc of Romania in the opening semifinals at Superkombat World Grand Prix II 2014 held in Mamaia, Romania and won via unanimous decision. Coming as outsider, he later faced Miles Simson in the finals, pulling off upset with another unanimous decision over the Surinamese.

In October, he lost a title eliminator to Yoann Kongolo at Superkombat World Grand Prix 2014 Final Elimination in Geneva, Switzerland. After dominating the fight, Bates eventually lost via a third round KO. After losing to Kongolo, Bates would go on a 2-2 run, defeating Pavel Turuk and Kev Ward, but losing to Ciprian Șchiopu and Alim Nabiev.

Glory
Bates signed with a two-fight contract with Glory in 2017. He made his promotional debut at Glory 40: Copenhagen against Richard Abraham. Bates won the fight by unanimous decision. Bates was next scheduled to fight Eyevan Danenberg at Glory 49: Rotterdam. Danenberg won the fight by unanimous decision.

Bates bounced back from this loss with decision wins over Tommy King at Glory 54 and Vedat Hoduk at Glory 70. On 29 February 2020, he made his fifth appearance inside the Glory ring when he took on the #2 ranked welterweight and former champion, Harut Grigorian, at Glory 75: Utrecht. Jamies Bates defeated Grigorian via unanimous decision.

Titles
 2014 Superkombat World Grand Prix II Light Heavyweight Tournament Championship
 2011 WKF Full Contact Light Cruiserweight Championship

Kickboxing record 

|-  style="background:#fbb;"
| 2023-03-11 || Loss ||align=left| Jay Overmeer || Glory 84 || Rotterdam, Netherlands || TKO (Three knockdowns) ||2 ||2:42

|-  bgcolor="#cfc" 
| 2022-12-10 || Win ||align=left| Joakim Hagg || Victory 10 || Newcastle upon Tyne, England || Decision (Unanimous) ||3 ||3:00  

|-  bgcolor="#c5d2ea"
| 2022-02-12 || NC ||align=left| Anghel Cardoş || Fight Fest Champions 16 || Newcastle, England || No Contest || 3 || 2:00
|-
! style=background:white colspan=9 |
|-
|-  bgcolor="#CCFFCC" 
| 2020-02-29 || Win ||align=left| Harut Grigorian || Glory 75: Utrecht || Utrecht, Netherlands || Decision (unanimous) || 3 || 3:00 
|-
|-  bgcolor="#CCFFCC"
| 2019-10-26 || Win ||align=left| Vedat Hoduk  || Glory 70: Lyon || Lyon, France || Decision (unanimous) || 3 || 3:00 
|-
|-  bgcolor="#CCFFCC"
| 2018-06-02 || Win ||align=left| Tommy King || Glory 54: Birmingham || Birmingham, England || Decision (unanimous) || 3 || 3:00 
|-
|-  bgcolor="#FFBBBB"
| 2017-12-09 || Loss ||align=left| Eyevan Danenberg || Glory 49: Rotterdam || Rotterdam, Netherlands || Decision (unanimous) || 3 || 3:00
|-
|-  bgcolor="#CCFFCC"
| 2017-04-29 || Win ||align=left| Richard Abraham || Glory 40: Copenhagen || Copenhagen, Denmark || Decision (unanimous) || 3 || 3:00 
|-
|-  bgcolor="#CCFFCC" 
| 2017-03-11 || Win ||align=left| Kev Ward || Road to Glory UK || Grantham, England || Decision (unanimous) || 3 || 2:00
|-  bgcolor="#FFBBBB"
| 2016-07-02 || Loss ||align=left| Ciprian Șchiopu || Respect World Series 2 || London, England || TKO (retirement) || 2 || 3:00
|-
|-  bgcolor="#FFBBBB"
| 2016-02-27 || Loss ||align=left| Alim Nabiev || ACB KB 5 || Orel, Russia || Decision (unanimous) || 3 || 3:00
|-
|-  bgcolor="#CCFFCC"
| 2015-10-16 || Win ||align=left| Pavel Turuk || ACB KB 3: Grand Prix Final || Sibiu, Romania || Decision (unanimous) || 3 || 3:00 

|-  bgcolor="#fbb"
| 2015-05-29 || Loss||align=left| Pavel Turuk || Tatneft Cup || Kazan, Russia || Ext.R Decision (unanimous) || 4 || 3:00 
|-
|-  bgcolor="#FFBBBB"
| 2014-10-25 || Loss ||align=left| Yoann Kongolo || Superkombat World Grand Prix 2014 Final Elimination || Geneva, Switzerland || KO (spinning back fist + flying knee) || 3 || 2:23
|-
! style=background:white colspan=9 | 
|-
|-  bgcolor="#CCFFCC" 
| 2014-05-24 || Win ||align=left| Miles Simson || Superkombat World Grand Prix II 2014, Final || Constanța, Romania || Decision (unanimous) || 3 || 3:00 
|-
! style=background:white colspan=9 |
|-
|-  bgcolor="#CCFFCC" 
| 2014-05-24 || Win ||align=left| Flavius Boiciuc || Superkombat World Grand Prix II 2014, Semi Finals || Constanța, Romania || Decision (unanimous) || 3 || 3:00

|-  bgcolor="#CCFFCC" 
| 2014-04-13 || Win ||align=left| Karl Langley || DUEL Fight Sports || United Kingdom || KO || 5 || 

|-  bgcolor="#CCFFCC"
| 2013-11-02 || Win ||align=left| Christian Di Paolo || The Main Event 2013 || Manchester, England || TKO (injury) || 3 || 

|-  bgcolor="#CCFFCC" 
| 2011-11-19 || Win ||align=left| Marlon Hunt || Duel Fight Sports || Newcastle, England || Decision (unanimous) || 12 || 2:00 
|-
! style=background:white colspan=9 |

|-  bgcolor="#fbb" 
| 2010-10-16 || Loss ||align=left| Andrew Tate || History IN The Making 4 - Undisputed! || Newark-on-Trent, United Kingdom || KO (Head kick)  || 8 ||  

|-  bgcolor="#CCFFCC" 
| 2009-06-13 || Win ||align=left|  Eletherios Chachmidis || Final Elimination, Tournament Final || Stanley, United Kingdom || Decision (Split) ||5  ||2:00 

|-  bgcolor="#CCFFCC" 
| 2009-06-13 || Win ||align=left| Allan Blondeau || Final Elimination, Tournament Semi Final || Stanley, United Kingdom || Decision  ||5  ||2:00 

|-  bgcolor="#CCFFCC" 
| 2009-06-13 || Win ||align=left| Reinis Porosozs || Final Elimination, Tournament Quarter Final || Stanley, United Kingdom || Decision  ||5  ||2:00 

|-  bgcolor="#CCFFCC" 
| 2009-03-21 || Win ||align=left| Michael Elmsly ||  || United Kingdom || Decision ||  || 
|-
| colspan=9 | Legend:

See also
List of male kickboxers

References

External links
 
 Jamie Bates at Glory Kickboxing

1989 births
Living people
English male kickboxers
Welterweight kickboxers
Glory kickboxers
SUPERKOMBAT kickboxers
Sportspeople from Durham, England